The Boileau premetro station is part of the Brussels Metro system. It is located in the municipality of Etterbeek in the Brussels-Capital Region of Belgium. The station opened on 30 January 1975. Named for the nearby Rue Boileaustraat, it is situated on the Sint-Michielslaan/Boulevard Saint-Michel section of the greater ring adjacent to the Boileau tunnel. It is the southernmost and last of the four stations on the greater ring premetro, connecting by Montgomery metro station to the north and the street-level tram halts at Pétillon metro station to the south. The station is served by the 7 and 25 trams and the 36 bus. The Thieffry metro station is situated close by to the west.

History 
This metro station is named after the great Boileau Alexis.

External links 
 Photographs of Boileau station
 Map showing surrounds of station

Etterbeek
Brussels metro stations